Vardøya is an island in Vardø Municipality in Troms og Finnmark county, Norway. The  island is the location of the town of Vardø. The island is connected to the mainland by the Vardø Tunnel, the first subsea tunnel that was built in Norway. The tunnel is part of the European route E75 highway, which has its terminus at the town of Vardø.

History
The island was probably originally two separate islands with a small strait between them; sometime during the Middle Ages a human-made isthmus was built connecting the two islands. Between the two parts of Vardøya is a long harbor. The town of Vardø was built up on this island primarily because it was the site of the Vardøhus Fortress (the island was often historically referred to as Vardöhuus, after the fortress). The fortress was originally built in 1306 and it is still in operation today.

The island (and fortress) were made famous by the historic 1553 voyage in search of the fabled Northeast passage. As the vessels rounded the rocky shores of Northern Norway they came in conflict with a 'whirlwind'. Two of the three ships (The Bona Esperanza and the Confidentia) were blown off course. The Bona Esperanza was captained by Sir Hugh Willoughby, a man of 'goodly personage' but one who had absolutely no knowledge of navigation. The expedition leader, Richard Chancellor had planned for such an eventuality, suggesting that the ships regroup at Vardöhuus. After waiting seven days and hearing nothing of either ship, he pushed eastward towards the White Sea.

See also
 List of islands of Norway

References

Vardø
Islands of the Barents Sea
Islands of Troms og Finnmark